Ghana Entertainment Awards USA is a Ghanaian music awards ceremony aimed at projecting the achievements of Ghanaian creatives and entertainers excelling in various crafts in and outside Ghana. The GEA exists to acknowledge the contributions of Ghanaian, African and international entertainers and artists. The Awards ceremony was founded in 2017 and usually takes place July annually.

Categories
Best Music Act Male 
Best music act female
Discovery of the Year – Female
Discovery of The Year – Male
Best Music Group
Producer of Music
Gospel Act of the Year 
Best Record Label of the Year
Entrepreneur of the year
Best Entertainment Blog
Best Comedy Act
Best Music Video Director
Best Movie Act
Best Radio Personality
Best TV personality
Best DJ Act – Ghana
Best Hypeman/MC
Best entertainment TV show
Best entertainment Radio show
Best Producer Radio/TV
Best Photographer
Best Event Sponsor
Best Youtuber/Vlogger
Best Dance Act
Best Sports Personality
Best African entertainer
Best African DJ
Best Stylist
Best Album
Best Music Act GH/USA
Best Diaspora Act
Best DJ Act GH/USA
Best US/Africa DJ
Best Online Radio/TV GH/USA
Best GH/USA event Promoter
Best GH/Canada Act
Entertainer of the year Gh/USA

References

External links

Ghanaian music awards
2017 establishments in Ghana